Luca Chiumento (born 19 November 1997) is an Italian rower who won a gold medal at the 2022 European Rowing Championships.

References

External links

1997 births
Living people
Italian male rowers
21st-century Italian people
20th-century Italian people
Rowers of Fiamme Gialle
World Rowing Championships medalists for Italy